Long Lost Family is a British television series that has aired on ITV since 21 April 2011. The programme, which is presented by Davina McCall and Nicky Campbell, aims to reunite close relatives after years of separation. It is made by the production company Wall to Wall. Long Lost Family is based on the Dutch series Spoorloos, airing on NPO 1 since 2 February 1990 and made by KRO-NCRV.

Synopsis
Presented by Davina McCall and Nicky Campbell, the series offers a last chance for people who are desperate to find long lost relatives. The series helps a handful of people, some of whom have been searching in vain for many years, find the family members they are desperately seeking. It explores the background and context of each family's estrangement and tracks the detective work and often complex and emotional process of finding each lost relative before they are reunited. With the help and support of Davina and Nicky, each relative is guided and supported through the process of tracing the member of their family they have been desperately seeking, in some cases for most of their lives. Long Lost Family reveals the background to each case, the social context of each case, and reasons why these estrangements occurred, from the single teenage mums who felt unable to keep their babies to the fathers who left and the twin sisters who were separated at birth.

Transmissions

Regular series

Long Lost Family: What Happened Next
A revisited series called Long Lost Family: What Happened Next has aired on ITV since 2014.

Long Lost Family: Born Without Trace

Awards and nominations

Reception
Michael Deacon of The Daily Telegraph gave the show a mixed review, stating "the presenters seemed to be trying slightly too hard to squeeze tears out of their interviewees". Deacon also commented, "I wonder what the producers would do if the two people they brought together, instead of embracing joyfully, launched into a furious rally of accusations and blame. Perhaps I'll tune in next week to see whether it happens, although that will depend on whether I can stomach more of Pavlov’s Piano, or for that matter Davina McCall's habit of talking to her interviewees, even the elderly ones, as if she were their proud mother, waving them off at the school gate".

Lucy Mangan of The Guardian gave a more positive review, commenting "Within its own parameters, it succeeds quite nicely. Davina's common touch remains infallible and her co-host Nicky Campbell's almost pathological lack of charisma is obscured and alleviated by his status as an adopted son himself, [which] makes the whole thing slightly less painful than it might have been". Mangan summed up the show as a "lovely documentary".

Alice-Azania Jarvis of The Independent gave a show a mixed to positive review, saying: "It was all very warm and fuzzy and just what you'd expect, apart from the presenters, who struck me as an odd duo. His connection is obvious – adopted at four days old – hers rather less so. Still, she's really rather good: none of the overgrown-yoof presenting she favours on Big Brother, much more concerned (grown-up) friend. I can't imagine this continuing for more than a couple of series – it's all a little one-trick: once you've got the hang of the tracking-down-strangers part, there's only so much to be astonished about. But, for the meantime, it ain't bad".

Sam Wollaston of The Guardian praised Long Lost Family, calling it "very good" and "so much more interesting than Who Do You Think You Are?". He added, "It's so moving because it's real, and it's about separation and hurt, guilt and regret, growing up, identity, belonging, family, love, life. Now I'm blubbing, like a baby."

International versions
On 1 March 2016, a US version of the same name premiered on TLC, starring Christopher Jacobs and Lisa Joyner. This version, sponsored by TLC and Ancestry.com, was produced by Shed Media which also produces the US version of Who Do You Think You Are. The series garnered some criticism in its handling of situations where the missing relative has passed away. In the UK and other versions, the family are told away from the cameras out of respect. In the US show, the family are told on camera and their reactions are filmed. Many viewers who took to social media described this as crass and disrespectful.

There is also a Norwegian version of Long Lost Family called Sporløs, which has been airing on Norwegian Channel TV 2 since 2010, with six seasons so far.

The Finnish version called Kadonneen jäljillä has been airing since 2009, with seven seasons so far.

The Australian version of Long Lost Family, hosted by Chrissie Swan and Anh Do, was screened on the Ten Network in 2016.

References

External links

2011 British television series debuts
ITV documentaries
2010s British documentary television series
2020s British documentary television series
Television series about family history
Television series by Warner Bros. Television Studios
Television shows set in the United Kingdom
English-language television shows